The 2018 Denver Outlaws season was the thirteenth season for the Denver Outlaws of Major League Lacrosse. The Denver Outlaws were coming off a 9-5 2017 season in which they finished in first place. They made it back to the league championship game, but lost for the fifth time in seven trips. This time, they lost a 2016 Steinfeld Cup rematch with the Ohio Machine, surrendering seven unanswered goals in the fourth quarter for a 17-12 defeat. However, the Outlaws came into 2018 with an 8-6 record and having won titles in back-to-back even-numbered years.

Offseason
November 14, 2017 - Assistant general manager and coach Jon Cohen was promoted to Director of Player Personnel, but continued his duties as assistant coach and assistant general manager. Cohen has been with the team for 11 of the franchise's 12 seasons.

Regular season
July 4 - In their inaugural Fourth of July Game, the Outlaws defend home field with a 25-11 victory over the Boston Cannons in front of 29,973 fans, the fourth largest attendance in league history.

Schedule

Postseason

Standings

References

External links
 Team Website 

Major League Lacrosse seasons
Denver Outlaws